The Sonobudoyo Museum is a Javanese history and culture museum and library in Yogyakarta, Indonesia. The museum contains the most complete collection of Javanese artifacts, after the National Museum in Jakarta. In addition to ceramics of the Neolithic era and bronze sculptures from the 8th century, the museum also includes collections of wayang (shadow puppets), various ancient weapons (such as keris), and Javanese masks.

The Sonobudoyo Museum consists of two units, with Unit I located at Jalan Trikora No. 6 Yogyakarta, and Unit II located at Ndalem Condrokiranan, Wijilan, to the east of main (northern) alun-alun in the city.

The museum also features nightly wayang and gamelan performances on weekdays, primarily for foreign and domestic tourists.

History 
The Java Instituut was a foundation established in 1919 in Surakarta for the study of the cultures of Java, Madura, Bali, and Lombok. In 1924, the Java Instituut held a congress in Surakarta to establish a museum with collections from the regions of Java, Madura, Bali, and Lombok.

On November 6, 1935, the Sonobudoyo Museum was inaugurated and opened to the public, with the word sono meaning "place" and budoyo meaning "culture" in Javanese.

In 1939, in order to support and complement the business of the Java Instituut, the Kunstambacht School or Sekolah Kerajinan Seni Ukir (Carving Arts and Crafts School) was opened.

Towards the end of 1974, the Sonobudoyo Museum was handed over to the Ministry of Education and Culture and became directly responsible to the Directorate General in 2000. The Sonobudoyo Museum joined the Provincial Office of Culture and Tourism of Yogyakarta in 2001.

Notes

Further reading
 Behrend, T.E. ed., Katalog Induk Naskah-naskah Nusantara. Jilid I, Museum Sonobudoyo, Yogyakarta. Jakarta: Penerbit Djambatan. xx, 802 pp. [Union Catalogue of Indonesian Manuscripts. Volume I, The Sonobudoyo Museum].
 Behrend, T.E. 'Report on the Proyek Mikrofilm Museum Sonobudoyo'. Caraka 14:15-26.

External links
 Official museum website 
 Official museum website 

Library buildings completed in 1935
Buildings and structures in Yogyakarta
Libraries in Indonesia
Museums in Yogyakarta